Michael Rappa is an American professor and founding director of the Institute for Advanced Analytics at North Carolina State University. He has a PhD from the University of Minnesota and has previously worked as a professor at the Massachusetts Institute of Technology.

References

University of Minnesota alumni
North Carolina State University faculty
Massachusetts Institute of Technology faculty
Living people
Year of birth missing (living people)